Dennis Ang Uy (born September 26, 1973) is a Filipino businessman and diplomat. Uy is the founder of Udenna Corporation, which has stakes in various businesses including Phoenix Petroleum.

Early life and education
Dennis Ang Uy was born and raised in Davao City to an ethnic Chinese family based in Davao, which is part of the Uys' third generation. Uy's grandparents, Ega Uy and Tao Sui Eng were ethnic Chinese who settled in Davao as merchants. They had a store which sold fishing equipment and bread while his parents ran a small business which sold copra.

He is the eldest among siblings. According to his own account, Dennis played basketball as a childhood hobby while at the same time sold school supplies and basketball cards to his classmates.

In 1993, Uy studied in De La Salle University in Manila to pursue a Bachelor of Science in Business Management degree and started to trade in the stock market. Since he had an average academic performance by his own account he decided against being a lawyer and described himself to be poor in memorization to consider pursuing a career in law.

Career

Business career

After finishing his tertiary education, Dennis Uy helped ran his family's business and interacted with older businessmen. His family's business was based in Tagum, and was involved in mining, supermarkets, car dealership among other industries. Uy worked with his family for ten years and at one point ran seven firms simultaneously. He decided to start his own business to gain independence as he felt that he did not have the freedom he aspired for himself working for his family.

He started his own business using income he gained from trading stocks while he was still in college and set up Dencio's Kamayan, a barbecue store (which shares the same name but unrelated to a Manila-based restaurant chain). He started his business portfolio independently without the aid of his family members. The barbeque chain grew to at least eight outlets before handing over the business to his sister when he decided to focus on participating in the petroleum industry. He also operated two community newspapers which served Davao City but both became defunct.

In 2002, he along his wife founded Udenna Corporation, a holdings company that would later manage his business interests in various industries. Within the same year, Phoenix Petroleum then known as the Oilink Mindanao Distribution Company was established. In 2004, the company was renamed as Davao Oil Terminal Services Corp. (DOTSCO) As part of this business, Uy set up a six million-barrel oil terminal serving businesses in the Davao region. Phoenix Petroleum adopted its name in 2006 and was listed in the Philippine Stock Exchange in 2007 and became the first Davao City-based company to join the stock market.

He founded Chelsea Logistics Holdings Corp. (CLHC) which is involved in the shipping and logistics industry, and a passenger ferry company.

In 2016, Uy's Udenna Corporation had various acquisitions. Udenna secured permission from the Philippine Amusement and Gaming Corporation to develop a casino resort in Mactan, Cebu. It also entered the liquefied petroleum gas (LPG) industry and acquired Enderun Colleges.

In November 2017, Udenna took over the development of the former Global Gateway Logistics City at the Clark Freeport Zone in Pampanga which was later relaunched as Clark Global City. And in 2018, a consortium between Udenna's Mislatel (now called as Dito Telecommunity) and China Telecom won the government-sanctioned bidding that would allow the consortium to become the third major telecommunications provider in the Philippines challenging the duopoly of PLDT and Globe Telecom.

Forbes estimated Uy's 2020 net worth at $650 million, ranking him as the Philippines' 22nd-richest.

Dennis Uy is also a director and vice chairman of Atok-Big Wedge. He has an existing 1,000 direct shares in the company. Atok-Big Wedge Co, Inc. a listed corporation in PSE, has 20% ownership of United Kingdom-based Forum Energy Ltd. which has the right of oil exploration in SC72 in the South China Sea. Forum Energy Ltd. has an ongoing talks with China for joint oil exploration after President Duterte– a close friend of Dennis Uy– lifted the moratorium on oil exploration.

Diplomatic career 
Dennis Uy is also a diplomat. He has been the honorary consul to Kazakhstan since November 2011. and is tasked to develop the bilateral ties of the Philippines with the Central Asian nation.

Involvement in sports
Uy through his company Phoenix Petroleum, owns a franchise in the Philippine Basketball Association. The team known as the Phoenix Super LPG Fuel Masters joined the PBA in 2016 as the Phoenix Fuel Masters after buying the Barako Bull Energy franchise. He is also the team's board governor. On July 18, 2016, Uy was appointed by then-President of the Philippines and ally Rodrigo Duterte as the presidential adviser for sports.

Personal life
Dennis Uy is married to Cherylyn Chiong who is a graduate of La Salle Academy, Iligan in high school and Business and Finance from the Ateneo de Davao University with whom he has three children; two daughters and a son. He is also a close friend of former Philippine President Rodrigo Duterte and was a major donor to Duterte's presidential campaign in 2016.

Controversies

Graft complaint against Uy and his complaints against ABS-CBN
In 2021, a graft complaint was filed before the Ombudsman against Uy, Alfonso Cusi and several others over the sale of Chevron's investment in the Malampaya project to Udenna Corporation, wherein the anomalies allegedly resulted in losses to the government. Uy later filed cyberlibel complaints against ABS-CBN Corporation, whose news organization had reported on a complaint against him, claiming that the latter's articles were libelous. The Davao City Office of the Prosecutor, in its resolution dated May 5, 2022, dismissed these complaints for lack of probable cause, saying that the articles were not defamatory.

References

People from Davao City
Filipino business executives
Filipino company founders
Filipino diplomats
Udenna Corporation
Duterte administration personnel
Honorary consuls of the Philippines
Filipino sports executives and administrators
1973 births
Living people
Filipino politicians of Chinese descent
De La Salle University alumni
People named in the Pandora Papers
Filipino people of Chinese descent